Southland is an American television drama series created by Ann Biderman.  It began airing on NBC on April 9, 2009. NBC announced that Southland had been renewed for a second season with an initial 13 episode order to begin airing on Friday, September 25, 2009, at 9:00 pm, one hour earlier than its original Thursday time slot. Shortly before its scheduled premiere, NBC moved the opening of its second season to October 23, 2009, citing the need to promote the show more fully. On October 8, 2009, just two weeks prior to the scheduled premiere, NBC announced that the series had been canceled.

On November 2, 2009, TNT announced it has purchased the rights to Southlands original seven episodes, as well as six completed episodes of what would have been its second season. Southland began airing its second season on January 12, 2010. On April 26, 2010, the network ordered 10 episodes for its third season, which began airing on January 4, 2011. A fourth season was ordered on March 22, 2011, which premiered on January 17, 2012.

On May 10, 2013, TNT announced that Southland had been canceled after five seasons.

Series overview

Episodes

Season 1 (2009)

Season 2 (2010)

Season 3 (2011)

Season 4 (2012)

Season 5 (2013)

Ratings

References

External links 

Lists of American crime drama television series episodes